The 2004–05 Cypriot Second Division was the 50th season of the Cypriot second-level football league. APOP Kinyras won their 1st title.

Format
Fourteen teams participated in the 2004–05 Cypriot Second Division. All teams played against each other twice, once at their home and once away. The team with the most points at the end of the season crowned champions. The first three teams were promoted to 2005–06 Cypriot First Division and the last three teams were relegated to the 2005–06 Cypriot Third Division.

Changes from previous season
Teams promoted to 2004–05 Cypriot First Division
 Nea Salamina
 Aris Limassol
 Alki Larnaca

Teams relegated from 2003–04 Cypriot First Division
 Anagennisi Deryneia
 Onisilos Sotira
 Doxa Katokopias

Teams promoted from 2003–04 Cypriot Third Division
 APOP Kinyras
 MEAP Nisou
 Chalkanoras Idaliou

Teams relegated to 2004–05 Cypriot Third Division
 PAEEK FC
 SEK Agiou Athanasiou
 Enosis Kokkinotrimithia

League standings

Results

See also
 Cypriot Second Division
 2004–05 Cypriot First Division
 2004–05 Cypriot Cup

Sources

Cypriot Second Division seasons
Cyprus
2004–05 in Cypriot football